Cindy Chi or Chi Hsin-ling is a Taiwanese actress.

Filmography

Film

Television series

References

External links
 
 

2001 births
21st-century Taiwanese actresses
Actresses from Taipei
Living people
Taiwanese child actresses